Tilleux is a commune in the Vosges department in Grand Est in northeastern France. It is 9 km south of Neufchâteau.

See also
Communes of the Vosges department

References

Communes of Vosges (department)